Bray is a locality in South Australia, roughly contiguous with the land administration division, the Hundred of Bray, after which it was named. It is located within the federal division of Barker, the state electoral district of MacKillop and the local government areas of the District Council of Robe and the Wattle Range Council.

See also
 List of cities and towns in South Australia
Lake Hawdon South Conservation Park

References 
Notes

Citations

Towns in South Australia
Limestone Coast